This is a list of number-one hit singles in 1979 in New Zealand, starting with the first chart dated 20 January 1979.

Chart 

Key
 – Single of New Zealand origin

Notes

 Number of number-one singles: 16
 Longest run at number-one: "Tragedy" by Bee Gees and "Some Girls" by Racey (6 weeks).
 Jezebel continued its peak at number one during January 1980

References

External links
 The Official NZ Music Chart, RIANZ website

1979 in New Zealand
1979 record charts
1979
1970s in New Zealand music